Jessica Tess McKellar is an American software developer, engineering manager, and author.

Education
McKellar attended the Massachusetts Institute of Technology and studied computer science and chemistry.

Work
McKellar was an early employee and engineering manager at Ksplice, which was acquired by Oracle in 2011. In 2012, she co-founded Zulip, a chat software company. In 2014, the company was acquired by Dropbox. She has spoken at several conferences about outreach efforts to increase the diversity of open-source communities.

From 2012 to 2014, she was a director of the Python Software Foundation. In 2013, McKellar won the O'Reilly Open Source Award for her contributions to Python. In 2016, she won the Women in Open Source Community Award, awarded by Red Hat. She is a contributor to Twisted, a networking framework for Python. From 2014 to 2017, she was a Director of Engineering and the chief of staff to the VP of Engineering at Dropbox.

McKellar was a senior technical advisor for 16 episodes of the HBO show Silicon Valley.

Author
McKellar is the co-author of the book Twisted Network Programming Essentials, 2nd Edition (O'Reilly Media - 2013).

References

Massachusetts Institute of Technology alumni
Place of birth missing (living people)
Living people
American women computer scientists
American computer scientists
1987 births
21st-century American women